Mitsuru Yoshida (吉田 満 Yoshida Mitsuru January 6, 1923 – September 17, 1979) was a Japanese author and naval officer. He was born in Tokyo.  He was a survivor of the battleship Yamato when it was sunk on 7 April 1945 during Operation Ten-Go, an attempt to support the defenders of Okinawa.

His best-known work is Senkan Yamato-no Saigo (戦艦大和ノ最期, Requiem for Battleship Yamato), based on his personal experiences as a junior officer on Yamato'''s final voyage.  It was made into a movie Senkan Yamato ("Battleship Yamato" Shin-Toho. Dir.: Yutaka Abe) in 1953. Another movie, Yamato, was released in 2005.

Selected bibliography

 Requiem for Battleship Yamato (Senkan Yamato-no Saigo'' translated by Richard H. Minear)  

Japanese writers
1923 births
1979 deaths
Imperial Japanese Navy officers
Japanese military personnel of World War II